The 2022 United States Grand Prix (officially known as the Formula 1 Aramco United States Grand Prix 2022) was a Formula One motor race, held on October 23, 2022, at the Circuit of the Americas in Austin, Texas, United States. The race was the 19th round of the 2022 Formula One World Championship and the 51st running of the United States Grand Prix, the 43rd time the race was run as a World Championship event since the inaugural  season, and the tenth time a World Championship round was held at the Circuit of the Americas in Austin, Texas.

It was won by defending champion Max Verstappen, who was followed by Lewis Hamilton in second and Charles Leclerc in third. With Verstappen taking victory and teammate Sergio Pérez finishing fourth, Red Bull secured its fifth Constructors' Championship title and the first since .

Background
The event was held across the weekend of October 21–23. It was the nineteenth round of the 2022 Formula One World Championship. Max Verstappen entered the race as the defending winner.

Championship standings before the race
Going into the weekend, Max Verstappen had secured his second consecutive Drivers' Championship at the previous round, the Japanese Grand Prix. He led by 113 points from teammate Sergio Pérez, second, and Charles Leclerc, third, by 114. Red Bull Racing team led the Constructors' Championship from Ferrari by 165 points and Mercedes by 232 points. Red Bull Racing could have secured their fifth World Constructors' Championship, and first since , if Ferrari would not outscore them by 19 points.

Entrants

The drivers and teams were the same as the season entry list with no additional stand-in drivers for the race. Four drivers made their Formula One practice debuts in the first practice session: Logan Sargeant in place of Nicholas Latifi at Williams, Robert Shwartzman in place of Charles Leclerc at Ferrari, Théo Pourchaire in place of Valtteri Bottas at Alfa Romeo, and Álex Palou in place of Daniel Ricciardo at McLaren. Antonio Giovinazzi drove for Haas in the same session in place of Kevin Magnussen.

Tyre choices

Tyre supplier Pirelli brought the C2, C3, and C4 tyre compounds (designated hard, medium, and soft, respectively) for teams to use at the event.

Qualifying

Qualifying classification 

Notes
  – Charles Leclerc received a ten-place grid penalty for exceeding his quota of power unit elements.
  – Sergio Pérez, Zhou Guanyu and Fernando Alonso received a five-place grid penalty for exceeding their quota of power unit elements. Zhou gained a position following Yuki Tsunoda's penalty.
  – Yuki Tsunoda received a five-place grid penalty for a new gearbox driveline.
  – Esteban Ocon qualified 17th, but he was required to start the race from the back of the grid for exceeding his quota of power unit elements. The new power unit elements were changed while the car was under parc fermé without the permission of the technical delegate. He was therefore required to start the race from the pit lane.

Race

Race classification 

Notes
  – Includes one point for fastest lap.
  – Alexander Albon finished 13th, but he received a five-second time penalty for leaving the track and gaining an advantage. His final position was not affected by the penalty.
  – Pierre Gasly finished 11th, but he received a ten-second time penalty for failing to serve a penalty following a safety car infringement.
  – Mick Schumacher received a five-second time penalty for exceeding track limits. His final position was not affected by the penalty.
  – Nicholas Latifi received a five-second time penalty for forcing Mick Schumacher off the track. His final position was not affected by the penalty.

Championship standings after the race

Drivers' Championship standings

Constructors' Championship standings

 Note: Only the top five positions are included for both sets of standings.
 Competitors in bold and marked with an asterisk are the 2022 world champions.

References

External links

United States
2022
United States Grand Prix
United States Grand Prix
United States Grand Prix